You may have been looking for Norbulingka Palace.

Norbulingka Institute, founded in 1995 by Kelsang and Kim Yeshi at Sidhpur, near Dharamshala, India, is dedicated to the preservation of the Tibetan culture in its literary and artistic forms.

Etymology
The institute is named after Norbulingka, the traditional summer residence of the Dalai Lamas, in Lhasa, Tibet. The ground plan is based on the proportions of Avalokitesvara, the thousand-armed god of compassion, with the temple as the head.

Overview

Norbulingka is dedicated to handing down tradition and restoring standards by providing training, education and employment for Tibetans. It supports an environment in which Tibetan community and family values can flourish. It reconciles the traditional creatively and respectfully with the modern, and seeks to create an international awareness of Tibetan values and their expression in art and literature. Norbulingka produces high quality, traditionally crafted art objects, as well as clothing and home furnishings. Free guided tours of the institute are available to visitors every day except Sunday. Workshop are also offered for those wishing to study Tibetan arts. The institute also runs two guesthouses—Norling Guesthouse and Chonor House. All proceeds from all Norbulingka's projects go directly back into the institute to further our endeavors to preserve Tibetan culture.

Norbulingka's art studios include Tibetan statue making, thangka painting, screen-printing, applique and tailoring, woodcarving, wood painting, papermaking, and wood and metal craft.

The Academy of Tibetan Culture, established in 1997, offers a three-year course of higher education in traditional Tibetan studies, as well as English, Chinese, and world history.

The Research Department of Norbulingka houses the team composing the official biography of the Dalai Lama, of which nine volumes in Tibetan have already been published. The research section is also compiling a comprehensive encyclopedia of Tibetan culture.

The institute also has the two-storeyed 'Seat of Happiness Temple' (Deden Tsuglakhang) built in 1985 and set amidst the Japanese inspired Norbulingka gardens. It is known for its 1,173 murals of Buddha, frescoes of all the Dalai Lamas and drawings chronicling the life of the 14th Dalai Lama. In the main hall stands the 4 mt high gilded copper Buddha Sakyamuni statue, made by institute's master statue-maker, the late Chenmo Pemba Dorje, and one of largest such statues outside Tibet. Around the temple are workshops of artisans and apprentices that produce various art objects, which are sold at the Norbulingka Shop, for the benefit of Tibetan refugees.

The Losel Doll Museum has diorama displays of traditional Tibetan scenes, using miniature Tibetan dolls in traditional costumes.

A short distance from the institute lies the Dolma Ling Buddhist nunnery, and the Gyato Monastery, temporary residence of the 17th Karmapa, Ogyen Trinley Dorje.

Further reading
 The Norbulingka Institute, by Portal to Asian Internet Resources (Project), Published by The Norbulingka Institute. 1995.
 Norbulingka: The First Ten Years of an Adventure, by Jeremy Russell, Nor-glin Bod kyi rig gźun gces skyon khan, Dharmsala, India. Published by Norbulingka Institute, 2006.

See also
 Tibetan Institute of Performing Arts

References

External links

  Norbulingka Institute website
Academy of Tibetan Culture Website
Norbulingka Institute at Central Tibetan Administration

Tibetology
Heritage organizations
Tibetan Buddhist art and culture
Tibetan art
Tibetan painting
Educational institutions established in 1995
Education in Dharamshala
History organisations based in India
1995 establishments in Himachal Pradesh
India–Tibet relations
Tibetan diaspora in India
Buildings and structures in Dharamshala